Arthur James Luke (17 May 1923 – 27 July 1996) was an Australian rules footballer who played for the Geelong Football Club in the Victorian Football League (VFL).

Notes

External links 

1923 births
1996 deaths
Australian rules footballers from Victoria (Australia)
Geelong Football Club players